Milton D. Reed (July 4, 1890 in Atlanta, Georgia – July 27, 1938 in Atlanta, Georgia) was a middle infielder in Major League Baseball from 1911 to 1915. He was later the player/manager for the Lakeland Highlanders in the Florida State League in 1921.

Sources

Baseball players from Georgia (U.S. state)
1890 births
1938 deaths
Major League Baseball shortstops
St. Louis Cardinals players
Philadelphia Phillies players
Brooklyn Tip-Tops players
Minor league baseball managers
Springfield Senators players
Davenport Prodigals players
Atlanta Crackers players
Portland Beavers players
Oakland Oaks (baseball) players
Denver Bears players
Mobile Sea Gulls players
Lakeland Highlanders players